École Française Les Grands Lacs (Great Lakes French School) is a French international school in Kampala, Uganda. It directly teaches until Troisième and then uses the National Centre for Distance Education (CNED) distance education programme for subsequent years until terminale (final year of lycée or upper secondary education).

References

External links
 École Française Les Grands Lacs 

Kampala
International schools in Uganda
Schools in Kampala